Horton High School may refer to one of several places:

In Canada:

Horton High School (Nova Scotia) —  Greenwich, Nova Scotia

In the United States:

Horton High School (Kansas) — Horton, Kansas
Hanover-Horton High School — Horton, Michigan
Ladue Horton Watkins High School — St. Louis, Missouri
 Horton High School, for Black children, is a former school in Pittsboro, North Carolina